The 2016 Grand Prix Cycliste de Montreal was the 7th edition of the Grand Prix Cycliste de Montreal road bicycle race. The race took place on 11 September 2016.

Teams
The eighteen UCI World Tour teams are automatically entitled and obliged to start the race. The race organisation gave out a few wildcards to some UCI Professional Continental teams.

Results

References

Grand Prix Cycliste de Montréal
2016 UCI World Tour
2016 in Canadian sports
2016 in Quebec
September 2016 sports events in Canada